Image Media Vision (IMV) is an Indian motion picture production company based in Mumbai. The company was founded in 2012 by Entrepreneur Prem Kumar Sharma and Bollywood Director Mihir Kumar Sharma.

The first film being produced by the company is Aayaam,  Deepak Singh and Diksha Panth in the lead role playing Engineering student. Vinod Nahardih  Mastram fame will be seen in very important role. Director Goutam Ghose is contributing as Special Appearance. The filming began in April 2014, whereas the film is expected to release in 2015.

Film production

References

External links
Official Website
facebook page
IMDB

Film production companies of Delhi
Indian companies established in 2012
Mass media companies established in 2012